, son of regent Uchitsune, was a kugyō or Japanese court noble of the Muromachi period (1336–1573). He held a regent position kampaku from 1338 to 1342. Tsunetsugu was his adopted son.

Family
 Father: Ichijo Uchitsune
 Mother: daughter of Saionji Kin’aki
 Wife: Toin no Rinzu
 Children:
 Ichijo Uchitsugu (1335/1336-1352?)
 Ichijo Fusatsune (1347/1348-1366) 
 Jisai
 Genru
 Adopted Son: Ichijo Tsunetsugu

References
 

1317 births
1365 deaths
Fujiwara clan
Ichijō family
People of Kamakura-period Japan
People of Nanboku-chō-period Japan